Kimzha is a village in Mezensky District, Arkhangelsk Oblast, Russia. It is part of the Dolgoshchelskoye Rural Settlement. 

In 2016 the Kimzha was included in The Most Beautiful Villages in Russia.

References 

Rural localities in Mezensky District
Cultural heritage monuments in Arkhangelsk Oblast
Objects of cultural heritage of Russia of regional significance